Larry Stegent (born December 1, 1947) is a former National Football League running back for the St. Louis Cardinals in 1971. He lettered in four sports, including football, at St. Thomas High School in Houston, Texas from which he graduated in 1966, and to whose Sports Hall of Fame he was named in 2003. Although highly touted during his collegiate career at Texas A&M, where he was a three-time all-Southwest Conference tailback  who played on A&M's 1968 Cotton Bowl championship team with future New Orleans Saints quarterback Edd Hargett, he proved to be a disappointment in the NFL (owing in part to a knee injury in his first and only preseason game) as he only played in seven games, recording just one reception for 12 yards.

Larry lives with his wife of  years, Patricia McConn Stegent (Bebe), in Houston, Texas.  They have 4 children, Tammy, Michael, Jason and John Casey.  He is the CEO of Stegent Insurance Associates for 44 years.  He is a life member of The Million Dollar Round Table and past member of The Top Of The Table.

References

1947 births
Living people
American football running backs
St. Louis Cardinals (football) players
Texas A&M Aggies football players
Players of American football from Houston